The 14th Street station was a station on the demolished IRT Sixth Avenue Line in Manhattan, New York City.  It had two tracks and two side platforms, and was served by trains from the IRT Sixth Avenue Line. The station opened on June 5, 1878, and was designed by famed Hudson River School painter Jasper Francis Cropsey, a trained architect. Beginning in 1907, the station had a connection to the 14th Street subway station of the Hudson and Manhattan Railroad. It closed on December 4, 1938. The next southbound stop was Eighth Street. The next northbound stop was 18th Street. Two years later the station was replaced by the IND Sixth Avenue Line platforms of the 14th Street / Sixth Avenue Subway station complex.

References

 

IRT Sixth Avenue Line stations
Railway stations in the United States opened in 1878
Railway stations closed in 1938
Former elevated and subway stations in Manhattan
1878 establishments in New York (state)
1938 disestablishments in New York (state)

Sixth Avenue
14th Street (Manhattan)